Anommatus duodecimstriatus is a species of beetle in family Bothrideridae. It is found in the Palearctic

References

Bothrideridae